Gary Dourdan (born Gary Robert Durdin: December 11, 1966) is an American actor. He is known for portraying Warrick Brown on the television series CSI: Crime Scene Investigation, Shazza Zulu on the television series A Different World and Mickey Monroe in crime thriller Righteous Villains.

Early life
Dourdan was born Gary Robert Durdin in Philadelphia, Pennsylvania, the son of Sandy, a teacher and fashion designer, and Robert Durdin, an entrepreneur and agent for jazz musicians. Dourdan is the fourth of five children. When he was six, his 21-year-old brother Darryl died after falling from a balcony in Haiti while "doing research on the family lineage." The case remains unsolved. In his youth he moved with his family to Willingboro Township, New Jersey. During that time, his interests included acting, music, and martial arts. Later, Dourdan moved to New York City, and he worked as a doorman at a rehearsal studio.

Career
Dourdan played in several bands in New York City in the early 1990s and acted in regional theatre in the New York metropolitan area. He acted in music videos, including playing Janet Jackson's love interest in the video for her 1993 hit "Again," and had a cameo in the music video "Move the Crowd" by Eric B. & Rakim. Debbie Allen cast him as Shazza Zulu on A Different World, based on a tape of him in an avant-garde play. In 1996, Dourdan appeared in the Lois & Clark: The New Adventures of Superman episode "Never on Sunday" playing Ziggy, an assistant to Baron Sunday. In 1997, he played Christie, the first mate and second in command of the spaceship Betty in the film Alien: Resurrection. He also appeared in the films Playing God and Thursday, and on television, he starred in the Dick Wolf production Swift Justice and played a recurring role on the series Soul Food. Dourdan joined hip-hop artist DMC (of Run–D.M.C.) onstage at the Live 8 concert in Barrie, Ontario, and sang alongside Macy Gray at the 2005 Emmy Awards. He is an alternative musician and a record producer.

In 2007, he played the character Cameron, the boyfriend of Rowena Price (Halle Berry), in the film Perfect Stranger.

Dourdan's most popular role was as a cast member of the series CSI, which debuted on October 6, 2000. He played analyst Warrick Brown, who has a checkered past fraught with gambling problems. By working in Las Vegas, the character uses his personal experiences to help his career.

In 2008, there was media speculation surrounding Dourdan's CSI contract negotiations with CBS. The parties could not reach a resolution, and as a result, his contract was not renewed. It was reported on April 14, 2008 that Dourdan was leaving the show. In the Season 8 finale, Dourdan's character was shot and left for dead at the episode's end. The Season 9 premiere revealed Dourdan's character dying in the arms of his colleague and friend Gil Grissom.

After leaving CSI, he took recurring roles as Stephan in the series Christine and Sheldon DeWitt in the series Being Mary Jane.

Personal life
Dourdan has African-American, Native American, Franco-Haitian (Haiti), Jewish, Irish, and Scottish ancestry. He married model Roshumba Williams in 1992; they divorced two years later.  He has two children: a son, Lyric, with Cynthia Hadden, and a daughter, Nyla, with Jennifer Sutton, whom Dourdan dated from 1995 to 2000.

Dourdan collects classic cars and was featured on Season 1, Episode 3, of Street Customs.

Legal issues
In 2008, Dourdan was arrested for possession of cocaine and ecstasy. A third charge, possession of heroin, was dropped.  Despite rumors, the drug charges had nothing to do with his departure from CSI, as the contract negotiations had already concluded and he had finished filming the last of his scenes before the incident. In July 2011, after crashing his car, Dourdan was arrested but charges were dropped for drug possession (oxycontin). He was, however, charged with possession of drug paraphernalia. In November 2011, he was arrested for felony battery after allegedly breaking his girlfriend's nose and placed on five years' probation. He was also ordered to attend weeks of domestic violence counseling and to stay away from the victim for five years. Dourdan filed for bankruptcy in August 2012, owing roughly $1.7 million to creditors.

Filmography

Film

Television

Music videos

Video games

Awards and nominations 
The following is a list of accolades received by Dourdan:

References

External links
 
 Interview (archived) at africana.com

1966 births
Living people
Male actors from Philadelphia
American male film actors
African-American male actors
American people of French descent
American people of Haitian descent
American people of Irish descent
American people of Jewish descent
American people who self-identify as being of Native American descent
People from Willingboro Township, New Jersey
American male television actors
American male voice actors
American male video game actors
21st-century African-American people
20th-century African-American people